Fulehuk Lighthouse is a coastal lighthouse in the municipality of Nøtterøy in Vestfold og Telemark, Norway. It was first lit in 1821, and replaced by a light in 1989.

See also

 List of lighthouses in Norway
 Lighthouses in Norway

References

External links
 Norsk Fyrhistorisk Forening 
 

Lighthouses completed in 1821
Lighthouses in Vestfold og Telemark